City Stadium is a sports stadium in Richmond, Virginia. It is owned by the City of Richmond and is located south of the Carytown district off the Downtown Expressway. The stadium was built in 1929 and seats approximately 22,000 people when both stands are used. It has been used by the Richmond Kickers of USL League One since 1995, at a capacity of 6,000.

The stadium was used by the University of Richmond for American football from 1929 to 2009. The University of Richmond's final home football game at the stadium was played on December 5, 2009, against Appalachian State University in the quarterfinals of the Football Championship Subdivision playoffs.

From 1964 through 1967, the stadium was home to the Richmond Rebels of the Atlantic Coast Football League and the Continental Football League. The Rebels left the Continental Football League in 1967 to become the Richmond Mustangs of the United American Football League.

University of Richmond Stadium served as the site of the NCAA Division I Men's Soccer Championship from 1995 to 1998. The venue broke an attendance record when 21,319 visited the semifinals of the 1995 NCAA Division I Men's Soccer Tournament, with matches between the Virginia Cavaliers and Duke Blue Devils, and the Portland Pilots and Wisconsin Badgers. For a time in the mid-2000s, the stadium also hosted Virginia's high school football state championship games.

Naming
The stadium was known as City Stadium until 1983, when it adopted the name University of Richmond Stadium or UR Stadium as part of an agreement, in which the University of Richmond agreed to lease the stadium for $1 per year in exchange for maintaining the facility.  The facility's name reverted to City Stadium in 2010 when the University of Richmond ended its tenancy and moved its football games to its new on-campus E. Claiborne Robins Stadium.

International soccer matches

References

External links
 Aerial picture
 Information on history and groundskeeping of the stadium

Defunct college football venues
Richmond Kickers
Richmond Spiders football
Sports venues in Richmond, Virginia
American football venues in Virginia
Soccer venues in Virginia
USL League One stadiums
Sports venues completed in 1929
1929 establishments in Virginia